Surl or Surls may refer to:

 James Surls (born 1943, American modernist artist
 Martin Surl, British public servant
 Surl, North Carolina